Natur-Energi A/S is a Danish utility company which produce all of its electricity from renewable sources such as wind, hydro, sustainable biomass and solar power. The company delivers CO2 neutral electricity to households and companies. Natur-Energi was founded  in 2008.

The main product is electricity endorsed and certified by the Swedish Society for Nature Conservation under the label Bra Miljöval. Bra Miljöval is approved by the Eugene Green Energy Standard

The company also offers verified carbon offset products to individuals and businesses.

See also

Ecotricity
Good Energy
Green Mountain Energy

References

Electric power companies of Denmark
Renewable energy companies of Europe
Renewable energy in Denmark
Energy companies established in 2007
Renewable resource companies established in 2007
Danish companies established in 2007